Diana Golub (née Zakaryaev; born 25 November 1992) is a Russian female handball player for HC Kuban Krasnodar and the Russian national team.

She made her debut on the Russian national team on 25 September 2019, against Slovakia.

Achievements 
 Russian Super League
Bronze Medalist: 2018/19
 Russian Cup
Silver Medalist: 2013/14

References

1992 births
Living people
Russian female handball players
Sportspeople from Krasnodar
People from Krasnodar